Çaybaşı, historically Cağdın, is a village in the Oğuzeli District, Gaziantep Province, Turkey. The village is populated by Abdals of the Maya Sekenler tribe and had a population of 551 in 2022.

References

Villages in Oğuzeli District